Gabra may refer to:

The Gabra people of eastern Africa
Gabra (village), village in Western Bulgaria, part of Elin Pelin Municipality, Sofia Province
Gabra Manfas Qeddus, Ethiopian Christian saint, and the founder of the monastery of Zuqualla
Gabra Mika'el, Roman Catholic martyr and associate of saint Giustino de Jacobis
Gawdat Gabra (born 1947), Coptologist